Steve Cross is the founder of Bright Club and Science Showoff.

Cross acts as a master of ceremonies during Science Showoff events. He is a past winner of the Joshua Phillips Award for Innovation in Science Engagement. In 2007, he was the head curator of the Medicine Man gallery at the Wellcome Collection.

References

External links

Year of birth missing (living people)
Living people
Comedians from Manchester
People associated with University College London
English male comedians
English curators